William Xalxo (born 14 June 1984) is a former Indian field hockey player who played as a defender for the national team. He was part of the Indian team that competed at the 2004 Summer Olympics.

References

External links
 
Player profile at bharatiyahockey.org

1984 births
Living people
People from Sundergarh district
Indian male field hockey players
Field hockey players from Odisha
Field hockey players at the 2004 Summer Olympics
Olympic field hockey players of India
Male field hockey defenders
Field hockey players at the 2006 Commonwealth Games
Commonwealth Games competitors for India